Autukia is a settlement in Kiribati it had a population of 112 in the 2010 census. It is located on Nonouti atoll; to its north are Abamakoro, Benuaroa, Teuabu, Temanoku and Rotuma, while Matang(the administrative centre), Taboiaki (the largest village) and Temotu are to the south.

References

Populated places in Kiribati